Joanna Monti-Masel (also known as Joanna Masel) is an American theoretical evolutionary biologist. Since 2016 she has been a full professor of ecology and evolutionary biology at the University of Arizona. She studies the question of evolvability, namely, why evolution works given that mutations to working systems will usually be detrimental to their function.

Early life

Masel was raised in Melbourne, Australia. She was educated at the University of Melbourne, taking her B.Sc. in 1996. She completed her D.Phil. in zoology at the University of Oxford in 2001. She went to Stanford University as a researcher before moving to the University of Arizona in 2004.

Career

Masel has published at least 75 peer-reviewed papers. In 2013 she received a research grant from the John Templeton Foundation to study how and where new genes arise. She runs a theoretical group in the University of Arizona's Ecology and Evolutionary Biology department where she investigates aspects of evolvability.

Masel argues that the conventional account of the origin of new genes, namely that they are commonly duplicated from old genes and then evolve to diverge from them, is a chicken and egg explanation, since a functional gene would have to exist before a new function could evolve. She suggests instead that new genes are born continually from non-coding DNA, a form of preadaptation.

Books

 Bypass Wall Street: A Biologist's Guide to the Rat Race, Perforce Publishing, 2016

Awards and distinctions

 Fellow, Wissenschaftskolleg zu Berlin, 2012–13
 Outstanding Faculty Mentor, Honorable Mention, University of Arizona Undergraduate Biology Research Program, 2011
 Pew Scholar in the Biomedical Sciences, 2007
 Alfred P. Sloan Research Fellow, 2007
 Merton College Prize Scholarship, 1999
 Rhodes Scholarship, 1997

Notes

References

Evolutionary biologists
Australian biologists
Alumni of Merton College, Oxford